Mthunzi Ntoyi (born 3 March 1986), is a South African actor. He is best known for the roles in the films and television serials: Thula's Vine, Intersexions and Taryn & Sharon. Apart from acting, he is also a stand-up comedian and musician.

Personal life
He was born on 3 March 1986 in South Africa.

Career
Before entering drama, he studied and trained at AFDA, The School for the Creative Economy (AFDA).

He is also appeared in several minor and supportive roles in the television serials such as: Khululeka, Montana, Intersexions, Stash, Single Galz, Sokhulu & Partners, The Wild, Scandal!, Home Affairs and The Lab. In 2014, he played the role of 'Zola Yili' in the SABC1 drama series Montana. Then he was selected for the role 'Waka' in the Mzansi Magic soapie Zabalaza. The role became very popular as he then recurred for three seasons. In 2014, he was nominated for the Golden Horn Award for Best Actor in a TV Drama for his role in Montana.

In 2016, he began co-hosting the daytime comedic adventure game show for children titled Disney Cookabout. The show is considered as the first collaboration between The Walt Disney Company Africa and SABC. The show aired for a long-form series in South Africa. In the series, he played the role 'Sous Chef Mthunzi' along with Chef Kirsten played by Kirsten Mohamed where they demonstrate to a dynamic group of 'cooktestants' how to create simple and appetizing meals. In 2017 he performed as 'Zuko', in the SABC1 sitcom Thuli noThulani. In 2018, he was nominated for the Golden Horn Award for Best TV Presenter for his role Disney Cookabout.

In addition to television, he appeared in some international as well as local films particularly in cameo appearances: Mr. Bones 2: Back from the Past, Skyfall and The Bang Bang Club. In August 2020, he starred in the comedy film Seriously Single co-directed by Katleho Ramaphakela and Rethabile Ramaphakela. It was released on July 31, 2020 on Netflix.

Television serials
 Disney Cookabout as Sous Chef Mthunzi
 Home Affairs as Guy Student 1
 Intersexions as Ntando
 Lockdown as Njabulo
 Montana as Zola Yili
 Scandal! as Sijo
 Single Galz as Finite
 Sober Companion as Comedian
 Stash as Sox
 Stokvel as Bongani
 Taryn & Sharon as Charles
 The Wild as Papi
 Thula's Vine as Sizwe
 Thuli noThulani as Zuko
 Zabalaza as Waka

References

External links
 

Living people
21st-century South African male actors
South African male film actors
South African male television actors
1986 births
People from Gauteng